Sulugoli Gol (also Romanized as Sūlūgolī Gol; also known as Soluglu-Tel, Solūklū, Solūklū Gol, Solyuglyu-Tel’, and Sūkalū Gol) is a village in Zarjabad Rural District, Firuz District, Kowsar County, Ardabil Province, Iran. At the 2006 census, its population was 132, in 28 families.

References 

Towns and villages in Kowsar County